Blåkulla is Swedish for "Blue hill", and may refer to:

 Blå Jungfrun, Swedish island in the Baltic Sea
 Blockula, legendary island where witches consort with the devil
 Blue residential buildings in Hagalund, Solna
 Residential area in Laholm